The canton of Bièvre is an administrative division of the Isère department, eastern France. It was created at the French canton reorganisation which came into effect in March 2015. Its seat is in La Côte-Saint-André.

It consists of the following communes:
 
Beaufort
Beauvoir-de-Marc
Bossieu
Bressieux
Brézins
Brion
Champier
Châtenay
Châtonnay
La Côte-Saint-André
Faramans
La Forteresse
La Frette
Gillonnay
Lentiol
Lieudieu
Marcilloles
Marcollin
Marnans
Meyssiez
Montfalcon
Mottier
Ornacieux-Balbins
Pajay
Penol
Plan
Porte-des-Bonnevaux
Royas
Roybon
Saint-Clair-sur-Galaure
Sainte-Anne-sur-Gervonde
Saint-Étienne-de-Saint-Geoirs
Saint-Geoirs
Saint-Hilaire-de-la-Côte
Saint-Michel-de-Saint-Geoirs
Saint-Paul-d'Izeaux
Saint-Pierre-de-Bressieux
Saint-Siméon-de-Bressieux
Sardieu
Savas-Mépin
Sillans
Thodure
Villeneuve-de-Marc
Viriville

References

Cantons of Isère